Pseudopostega kempella is a small, white moth of the family Opostegidae. The top of its forewings are each marked with a small, brown spot. It known only from the type locality of Key Largo in southern Florida.

The length of the forewings is 1.8–2.5 mm. Adults are on wing in October and November.

External links
A Revision of the New World Plant-Mining Moths of the Family Opostegidae (Lepidoptera: Nepticuloidea)

Opostegidae
Moths described in 1967